Under Your Spell is the seventh studio album by Canadian electronic rock band The Birthday Massacre, released on June 9, 2017, through Metropolis Records. The album was funded, once again, through PledgeMusic.

Track listing 

Notes
 "One" – Additional writing, programming, production and lyric inspiration by Aaron J. Cunningham (SINS)
 "All of Nothing" – Additional writing, programming, production by Aaron J. Cunningham (SINS)
 "Counterpane" – Lyrics, vocal melody and additional programming by Matthew O'Halloran
 "The Lowest Low" – Additional programming and production by Aaron J. Cunningham (SINS). Lyrics and vocal melody by Matthew O'Halloran
 "Endless" – Additional programming and production by Kevin James Maher

Personnel 
Under Your Spell album personnel adapted from CD liner notes.

Chibi – songwriter, vocals
Michael Rainbow – songwriting, vocals, production, mixing
Michael Falcore – songwriting, vocals, production, mixing
Aaron J. Cunningham – additional songwriting, programming, production and lyric inspiration
Matthew O'Halloran – songwriting and additional programming
Kevin James Maher – additional programming and production
Dave Ogilvie – mix engineer, mixing at Fader Mountain Studios, Vancouver, Canada
Karl Dicaire – assistant mix engineer
Noah Mintz – mastering at Lacquer Channel, Toronto, Canada
Owen MacKinder – album art and design
Recorded At: Dire Studios (Toronto), The Altar Studios (Toronto, Canada), and Desolation Studios (Toronto, Canada)

Charts

References

External links 

''Under Your Spell' at Metropolis Records

2017 albums
The Birthday Massacre albums
Metropolis Records albums